Bishop's Castle may be:

Bishop's Castle, town in Shropshire, England
Bishop's Castle Community College, a secondary school in the town
Bishop's Castle (UK Parliament constituency)
Bishop's Castle, Glasgow, former castle in Glasgow, Scotland
 Bishop Castle,  Colorado, USA

See also
Bishop's Palace (disambiguation)